Liese may refer to:

 Thomas Liese (born 1968), former German professional cyclist
 Peter Liese (born 1965), German politician and Member of the European Parliament
 Fred Liese (1885–1967), pinch hitter in Major League Baseball
 Walter Liese (1926–2023), German forestry and wood researcher and wood biologist
 Liese (Glenne), a river of North Rhine-Westphalia, Germany, tributary of the Glenne
 Liese (Nuhne), a river of North Rhine-Westphalia, Germany, tributary of the Nuhne
 a short form of Elizabeth (given name)
 Single from the special edition of Liebe ist für alle da, by Rammstein